Ancaster High School is a member of the Hamilton-Wentworth District School Board. The school's enrollment for 2014 was 3923, with Korean, Urdu, Mandarin, Russian, Spanish, and Arabic being languages of note spoken by students along with English. The Ontario Secondary School Literacy Test (OSSLT) is used to assess Grade 10 students' skills in reading and writing. Successful completion of the test is one of 32 requirements students need to attain in order to receive an Ontario Secondary School Diploma. The school also offers special education classes as well as an ESL program.  Ancaster High School is a registered International Baccalaureate School.

Notable alumni
Marv Allemang, football player
Brad Cheeseman, jazz bassist
Marcia MacMillan, news anchor
Jana Prikryl, poet

See also
List of high schools in Ontario

School Interior

Ancaster High School can be divided into two sectors. The East, and West Wings. The West Wing is a located on the right side of campus with a visible white sign stating “West Wing”. Locations in the West Wing include: The auditorium, Chemistry Labs, Science Classes, French Classes, and the West Cafeteria. What separates the two sectors is a passage known as “The Tunnel”. The East Wing is much older and includes areas such as Gym A/B, Gym C, East Cafeteria, Main Office, Math Classes, English Classes, Geography/History classes and several elective classes.

Turf

The Turf refers to the large multipurpose field behind the school. It was completed on December 1st, 2020 and had a budget of $1.25Million dollars. The Turf was built for Ancaster High’s Football Team but is also used for gym classes, soccer, and track and field. The Turf was also used for the recent Grade 9 Night on September 15, 2022 for activities.

References

West Wing
West Cafeteria
East Wing
East Cafeteria
Auditorium
Gym A/B
Gym C
Gym D
Ancaster Aquatic Centre

External links
 School Board profile of Ancaster High School
 Ancaster High School Logo

High schools in Hamilton, Ontario
Educational institutions established in 1959
1959 establishments in Ontario